Beraki Beyene (born 6 February 1980) is an Eritrean long distance runner who specialises in the marathon. He competed in the marathon event at the 2015 World Championships in Athletics in Beijing, China.

References

External links
 

1980 births
Living people
Eritrean male long-distance runners
Eritrean male marathon runners
World Athletics Championships athletes for Eritrea
Place of birth missing (living people)